The 2017 Canterbury-Bankstown Bulldogs season is the 83rd in the club's history. Coached by Des Hasler and captained by James Graham, they competed in the National Rugby League's 2017 Telstra Premiership after finishing the 2016 season in 7th place.

Fixtures

Regular season

Ladder

Squad

See also
 List of Canterbury-Bankstown Bulldogs seasons

References

Canterbury-Bankstown Bulldogs seasons
Canterbury-Bankstown Bulldogs season